is a former Japanese football player. He played for Japan national team.

Club career
Yamaguchi was born in Fujieda on September 28, 1944. After graduating from Chuo University, he joined Hitachi (later Kashiwa Reysol) in 1967. In 1972, the club won the champions at Japan Soccer League and Emperor's Cup. The club also won 1975 Emperor's Cup. He retired in 1975. He played 121 games and scored 15 goals in the league. He was selected Best Eleven for 7 years in a row (1968-1974).

National team career
In October 1964, he Yamaguchi selected Japan national team for 1964 Summer Olympics in Tokyo. At this competition, he debuted and played all matches. In 1968, he was also selected Japan for 1968 Summer Olympics in Mexico City. He played 5 matches and Japan won bronze medal. In 2018, this team was selected Japan Football Hall of Fame. He also played at 1966 and 1970 Asian Games. He played 49 games for Japan until 1973.

Coaching career
After retirement, Yamaguchi became a manager for Japan U-23 football team for 1992 Summer Olympics. However, at 1992 Summer Olympics qualification, following Japan's failure to qualify for 1992 Summer Olympics, Yamaguchi resigned. In 1993, he returned to Kashiwa Reysol and managed the club 1 season.

In 2007, Yamaguchi was selected Japan Football Hall of Fame.

Club statistics

National team statistics

Awards
 Japan Soccer League Best Eleven: (7)  1968, 1969, 1970, 1971, 1972, 1973, 1974

References

External links
 
 
 Japan National Football Team Database
 Japan Football Hall of Fame at Japan Football Association
Japan Football Hall of Fame (Japan team at 1968 Olympics) at Japan Football Association
 
 

1944 births
Living people
Chuo University alumni
Association football people from Shizuoka Prefecture
Japanese footballers
Japan international footballers
Japan Soccer League players
Kashiwa Reysol players
Olympic footballers of Japan
Olympic medalists in football
Olympic bronze medalists for Japan
Medalists at the 1968 Summer Olympics
Footballers at the 1964 Summer Olympics
Footballers at the 1968 Summer Olympics
Asian Games medalists in football
Asian Games bronze medalists for Japan
Footballers at the 1966 Asian Games
Footballers at the 1970 Asian Games
Japanese football managers
Kashiwa Reysol managers
Association football defenders
Medalists at the 1966 Asian Games
People from Fujieda, Shizuoka